The King is Dancing (Le Roi danse) is a 2000 costume drama by Belgian filmmaker Gérard Corbiau based on Philippe Beaussant's biography of Jean-Baptiste Lully, Lully ou le musicien du soleil (1992). The film, presenting libertine and pagan Lully as a natural ally of the early Enlightenment figure Louis XIV of France in his conflicts with the Catholic establishment, focuses on Lully's personal relationship with the King, as well as his camaraderie with Molière and rivalry with Robert Cambert.

Plot
Lully (Boris Terral) starts to gain the favour of the 14-year-old King Louis in 1653 by giving him specially designed shoes for Ballet Royal de la Nuit. His subsequent rise draws hostility from the old cadres of the court, particularly the royal composer Cambert (Johan Leysen). However, following Cardinal Mazarin's death, Louis (Benoît Magimel) installs himself in full power as the king in 1661 and he is now at stake with the religious establishment created and controlled by his mother Anne of Austria (Colette Emmanuelle) at the Palais-Royal. On the other hand, Lully's animosity with Cambert comes to a novel dimension after Cambert's mistress Madeleine Lambert (Cécile Bois), the daughter of Michel Lambert, marries Lully in 1662. Lully and another Versailles favourite Molière (Tchéky Karyo) are keen to further disarm the old court but they get to understand their limits when conflict becomes more manifest at events such as staging (and consequent ban) of Tartuffe in 1664. Meanwhile, the passing years bring an end to Lully's position as the king's dance teacher and choreographer and he also has to face the emotional tensions growing with his wife's niece Julie (Claire Keim), which will culminate at the gala of Cambert's Pomone in 1671.

Cast
 Benoît Magimel as Louis XIV
 Boris Terral as Jean-Baptiste Lully
 Tchéky Karyo as Molière
 Johan Leysen as Robert Cambert
 Cécile Bois as Madeleine Lambert
 Claire Keim as Julie
 Idwig Stéphane as Prince de Conti
 Caroline Veyt as Armande Béjart
 Ingrid Rouif as Madame de Montespan
 Jacques François as Jean de Cambefort
 Pierre Gérald as Jean-Baptiste Boësset
 Vincent Grass as Archbishop of Paris
 Jean-Louis Sbille as Spectator
 Colette Emmanuelle as Anne of Austria
 Serge Feuillard as Cardinal Mazarin

Production
The film was shot on location at Versailles, as well as in other locations in France, Germany and Belgium. Sets for the film were built at MMC Studios in Cologne.

External links
 
 BBC review of The King is Dancing

2000 films
2000s historical films
2000s biographical films
French historical drama films
French biographical drama films
Belgian historical drama films
German historical drama films
Films directed by Gérard Corbiau
Films about classical music and musicians
Films about composers
Biographical films about musicians
Films about Louis XIV
Films set in the 1650s
Films set in the 1660s
Films set in the 1670s
Cultural depictions of Molière
Cultural depictions of Cardinal Mazarin
Cultural depictions of classical musicians
French-language Belgian films
2000s French-language films
Belgian biographical drama films
German biographical drama films
2000s French films
2000s German films